Michele Limon is an Italian research scientist at the University of Pennsylvania. Limon studied physics at the Università degli Studi di Milano in Milan, Italy and completed his post-doctoral work at the University of California, Berkeley. He has been conducting research for more than 30 years and has experience in the design of ground, balloon and space-based instrumentation. His academic specialties include Astrophysics, Cosmology, Instrumentation Development, and Cryogenics.

As a research scientist at Princeton University from 1996 to 2001, Limon worked on the Wilkinson Microwave Anisotropy Probe (WMAP) project with NASA. WMAP was a NASA Explorer mission that launched June 2001 to make fundamental measurements of cosmology-the study of the properties of the universe as a whole. WMAP was extremely successful, producing the new Standard Model of Cosmology. Limon continued working on WMAP at NASA Goddard Space Flight Center from 2001 to 2008. Limon and the WMAP team received the 2012 Gruber Yale Cosmology Prize and 2018 Breakthrough Prize in Fundamental Physics for their contributions to modern cosmology.

In 2008, Limon moved to Columbia University as a research scientist to build the E and B Experiment (EBEX), a balloon-borne microwave telescope designed to measure the polarization of the Cosmic Microwave Background (CMB). It collected data during an 11-day science flight over Antarctica. Measurements of the polarization of the CMB could probe an inflationary epoch that took place shortly after the big bang and significantly improve constraints on the values of several cosmological parameters. EBEX was designed to provide critical information about the level of polarized Galactic dust which will be necessary for all future CMB polarization experiments. In October 2014, Limon was awarded the Thomson Reuter prize of Highly Cited Researcher; this prize recognizes researchers that are in the top 1% of most cited scientists.

Limon is currently working on the Simons Observatory, a suite of ground-based telescopes in the Atacama Desert in Chile designed to measure the intensity and polarization of the CMB. The Simons Observatory aims to reveal information about the contents and energy density of matter in the Universe and test theories of inflation.

References

Living people
1961 births
University of Milan alumni
Columbia University faculty
Scientists from Milan
Place of birth missing (living people)
Italian astrophysicists
Italian expatriates in the United States